The Liverpool Medical Students Society (LMSS) is the official Medsoc of the School of Medicine at the University of Liverpool. The mission of the society is to represent and care for the students of the School of Medicine of the University of Liverpool. It is a Registered Charity in its own right, providing complete independence from the Liverpool Guild of Students, the University's Students' Union, to which it was previously affiliated.  The Society's weekly Thursday meetings are held in the Grade II-listed Victoria Building. The Society's principal roles include the educational, pastoral, social and extracurricular needs of the Liverpool medical students and to represent the students' voice to the staff of the School of Medicine.

The Society also holds meetings and events at the Liverpool Medical Institution and the Liverpool Athenaeum, a private members' club in Liverpool city centre.

The Society's Honorary President for 2020/21 is the Executive Pro-Vice Chancellor of the University of Liverpool Faculty of Health and Life Science, Professor Louise Kenny MBChB (Hons), PhD, MRCOG. She has over >200 original peer reviewed papers, book chapters and reviews. Professor Kenny was also awarded Researcher of the Year in 2015 and Irish Tatler's Woman of the Year for STEM in 2015.

History
The Liverpool Royal Infirmary School of Medicine Debating Society (MSDS) was founded in 1874 by Dr. Richard Caton. The society was formed seven years ahead of the University of Liverpool. The original society was a male-only entity, and often debated such things as whether females should be admitted into the medical school. In 1885 it became the University College Medical School Debating Society, then 1902 a further change of name to the Liverpool University Medical School Debating Society. The society finally decided to admit female medical students in 1905, and the first female doctor to graduate from Liverpool was Phoebe Powell in 1910.The society began publishing a magazine "the Sphincter" in 1937 a play on the university student magazine the Sphinx  In 1943 the society changed their name to the "Liverpool Medical Students Society", wanting to being recognised for more than debating. The society is the longest-running students society at the university.

The Society records the names of its Student Officers and Honorary Presidents in the Jack Leggate Theatre of the Victoria Gallery & Museum. Previous Honorary Presidents of the Society have included Henry Cohen, 1st Baron Cohen of Birkenhead, Professor Sir Ian Gilmore, Professor Sir Cyril A. Clarke KBE, and Professor Thomas Cecil Gray CBE KCSG. It's plaque reads:"Established as Royal Liverpool Infirmary School of Medicine Debating Society in 1874 by Dr. Richard Caton, Making this the oldest society of its kind in the country. Continued as University College Medical School Debating Society from 1885, Becoming Liverpool University Medical School Debating Society in 1902. It was finally transformed to Liverpool Medical Students Society in 1943."

Governance 
The Society is registered as a charity in England and Wales. The board consists of 14 members, of whom most are senior practicing Medical Practitioners and eminent Alumni. The Society is run primarily by three officers, the President, Treasurer and Secretary. A full committee of 39 medical students is elected at the AGM. They cover a portfolio of areas including entertainment & socials, charities, welfare, clubs & societies and the Annual Medical Ball.

Notable Alumni who have served as Officers or Committee Members, and/or have demonstrated an exceptional and sustained commitment to multiple avenues of Society activity, to tirelessly further the interests of the Society are elevated to Honorary Life Membership of the Society.

Meetings
The Society holds meetings on Thursdays where a Guest is invited to address the Society.

Notable Alumni & Honorary Presidents
Professor Sir Cyril A. Clarke KBE
Dr. Richard Caton
Professor Sir Ian Gilmore
Professor Thomas Cecil Gray CBE KCSG
Mr. John (Jack) Mortimer Leggate FRCS
Henry Cohen, 1st Baron Cohen of Birkenhead
Dr Ruth Hussey OBE CB
Regius Professor of Medicine Emeritus Sir David Weatherall GBE DL MBChB FRCP FRCPE FRS FMedSci
Emeritus Professor Averil Mansfield CBE
Professor Sir Miles Irving

2014-2016 'Smoker' controversy & temporary University De-ratification
More recently, the Society has gathered national media attention for its "Jack Leggate" song and its infamous Annual Smoking concert which started in the 1880s.

On 10 November 2014 the online feminist magazine The Vagenda tweeted a screenshot which apparently showed a proposed script for the Annual Smoking Concert which had been circulated among fourth year medical students.
The explicit content sparked claims that students responsible were misogynistic and that the concert itself was contributing to a "Lad culture" at the university. The Mirror Online highlighted the explicit lyrics of the LMSS's "Jack Leggate song", stating;

"The society is also known for singing an explicit song at society events which includes the line “we like those girls who say they won't but look as though they might”"

The university and Liverpool Guild of Students subsequently released a statement condemning the content and promising an internal inquiry into the materials for the production.

On 14 January 2016 Liverpool Guild of Students officially de-ratified the society barring its use of guild services.

On 15 January 2016, a petition was created on change.org opposing the de-ratification of the LMSS, which demanded the immediate resignation of Liverpool Guild of Students President Harry Anderson. The petition gained over 1,200 signatures in 3 days.
. The society maintains its commitment to change its perceived culture of exclusivity  with a revamped agenda on cultural diversity and inclusion and build on its longstanding tradition of charity work.

On 5 February 2019, it was announced that the LMSS was fully re-integrating with the University of Liverpool.

References

External links

Clubs and societies of the University of Liverpool
Medical students